Stephanie "Steffi" Westerfeld (October 8, 1943 – February 15, 1961) was an American figure skater.

She earned a place on the United States' world team for the 1961 World Figure Skating Championships, after she finished second at 1961 U.S National Championships.

She died on February 15, 1961, when Sabena Flight 548 crashed on its way to the World Championships in Prague. She was buried in Evergreen Cemetery in Colorado Springs, Colorado. Her sister, Sharon, was also killed in the crash and is buried next to her in the family plot.

Westerfeld was an honor student, pianist, and homecoming queen at Cheyenne Mountain High School.

Results

References 

American female single skaters
1943 births
1961 deaths
Figure skaters from Colorado Springs, Colorado
Victims of aviation accidents or incidents in Belgium
Burials at Evergreen Cemetery (Colorado Springs, Colorado)
Victims of aviation accidents or incidents in 1961
20th-century American women